Webster is an unincorporated place and important railway point in Unorganized Kenora District in northwestern Ontario, Canada. It is located on Webster Bay on Lost Lake on the English River, part of the Nelson River drainage basin.

It is on the Canadian National Railway transcontinental main line, between Taggart to the west and Hudson to the east, and is passed but not served by Via Rail transcontinental Canadian trains.

References

Communities in Kenora District